The 1927 Isle of Man Tourist Trophy saw more changes occur with a fatal accident during practice to Archie Birkin, a brother to Tim Birkin of the Bentley Boys fame. The corner in Kirk Michael where the accident occurred was renamed Birkins Bend and from 1928 practice sessions were held on closed-roads.

Senior TT (500cc)

Junior TT (350cc)

Lightweight TT (250cc)

External links 
 Detailed race results
 Isle of Man TT winners
 Mountain Course map

Isle of Man TT
1927
Isle